Berck Basketball Club is a French professional basketball team that is located in the commune of Berck, in the north of France.

History
The club was founded in 1929, as A.S. Berck (French: Association Sportive de Berck), but its peak was during the 1970s, when they became back-to-back French League champions, and reached the FIBA European Champions Cup (EuroLeague) semifinals twice in a row.

Names through history
1929–1975: A.S. Berck Basket
1975–present:    Berck B.C.

Honours

Domestic competitions 
 French League 
 Champions (2): 1972–73, 1973–74

International record

Notable players

 Pierre Galle
 Mike Stewart

Wheelchair section
3× European Champion (1985, 1986, 1989)

External links
Official website (French)

Basketball teams in France